Coleophora expressella is a moth of the family Coleophoridae. It is found from Fennoscandia, through Germany and Poland to Italy. It has also been recorded from Bulgaria and China.

The larvae feed on Achillea millefolium. They create a tubular, felty, three-valved case with a length of up to 12 mm. The mouth angle is about 45°. Larvae can be found from autumn to June.

References

expressella
Moths described in 1902
Moths of Europe
Moths of Asia